Spears of Heaven is the eleventh full length studio album released by the black metal band Graveland. It was released on No Colours Records in 2009.

Track listing

Personnel

Additional personnel
 Christophe Szpajdel - logo

External links
Official site
Lords of Metal review
Metal Archives
Hierophant Nox review

Graveland albums
2009 albums